Halifax station is an MBTA Commuter Rail station in Halifax, Massachusetts. It serves the Plymouth/Kingston Line. It is located off Holmes Street (Massachusetts Route 36) in northeastern Halifax. It opened when service was restored on the Old Colony Lines on September 29, 1997. It has two tracks and two platforms to allow trains to pass at the station (most of the 1997-opened stations have only one track).

The station was quickly the busiest on the line. The original 281-space lot was expanded by 120–150 spaces around 2000. 

The New Haven Railroad's Halifax station, closed with the rest of the Old Colony Division in 1959, was located on the opposite side of Holmes Street.

References

External links
MBTA - Halifax

MBTA Commuter Rail stations in Plymouth County, Massachusetts
Railway stations in the United States opened in 1997